This is a list of members of the 23rd Legislative Assembly of Queensland from 1923 to 1926, as elected at the 1923 state election held on 12 May 1923.

During the term, the United Party (formerly the National Party) and the Country Party merged to form the Country and Progressive National Party, which became the main conservative party until the late 1930s.

  On 31 July 1923, the Labor member for Warrego, Harry Coyne, resigned and was appointed to the bench of the Queensland Land Court. Labor candidate Randolph Bedford won the resulting by-election on 13 October 1923.
  On 31 July 1924, the Labor member for Buranda, John Huxham, resigned to take up an appointment as Agent-General for Queensland in London. Labor candidate Ted Hanson won the resulting by-election on 16 August 1924.
  On 26 February 1925, the Labor member for Toowoomba, Frank Brennan, resigned following his appointment to the Supreme Court of Queensland. Labor candidate Evan Llewelyn won the resulting by-election on 4 April 1925.
  On 22 September 1925, the Labor member for Chillagoe and former Premier of Queensland, Ted Theodore, resigned to stand for the seat of Herbert at the 1925 federal election. Labor candidate John O'Keefe won the resulting by-election on 16 January 1926.
  On 24 October 1925, the Labor member for Eacham and Premier of Queensland, William Gillies, resigned to become a member of the new trade and arbitration board. Labor candidate Cornelius Ryan won the resulting by-election on 16 January 1926.

References

 Waterson, Duncan Bruce: Biographical Register of the Queensland Parliament 1860-1929 (second edition), Sydney 2001.

See also
1923 Queensland state election
Theodore Ministry (Labor) (1919–1925)
Gillies Ministry (Labor) (1925)
McCormack Ministry (Labor) (1925–1929)

Members of Queensland parliaments by term
20th-century Australian politicians